Carlos Ohene (born 21 July 1993) is a Ghanaian footballer who plays for Bulgarian First League side CSKA 1948 as a midfielder.

References

External links

1993 births
Living people
Ghanaian footballers
Ghanaian expatriate footballers
Cypriot First Division players
First Professional Football League (Bulgaria) players
Saudi Professional League players
Alki Larnaca FC players
AEL Limassol players
PFC Beroe Stara Zagora players
Ohod Club players
FC CSKA 1948 Sofia players
Ghanaian expatriate sportspeople in Cyprus
Expatriate footballers in Cyprus
Ghanaian expatriate sportspeople in Bulgaria
Expatriate footballers in Bulgaria
Ghanaian expatriate sportspeople in Saudi Arabia
Expatriate footballers in Saudi Arabia
Association football midfielders